"Humanos a Marte" is a song performed by Puerto Rican singer Chayanne, released as the lead single from his upcoming fifteenth studio album En Todo Estaré, by Sony Music Latin on April 20, 2014. The song was written by Chayanne and Fernando Montesinos. On June 17, Chayanne released a remix urban version of the song, featuring the Puerto Rican singer Yandel.

Track listing 
Digital download
 "Humanos a Marte" -

Official versions 
Album version (3:45)
Urbano Remix feat. Yandel (3:34)
Duet with Brazilian singer Paula Fernandes, a Portuñol version (3:45)

Charts

Weekly charts

Year-end charts

Certifications

References 

2014 singles
Chayanne songs
Spanish-language songs
2014 songs
Sony Music Latin singles
Yandel songs